The 2019 Swedish Open was a tennis tournament played on outdoor clay courts as part of the ATP Tour 250 Series of the 2019 ATP Tour and as part of the WTA 125K Series. It took place in Båstad, Sweden, from 15 through 21 July 2019 for the men's tournament, and from 8 through 13 July 2019 for the women's tournament. It was the 72nd edition of the event for the men and the 10th edition for the women.

Points and prize money

Point distribution

Prize money 

1 Qualifiers prize money is also the Round of 32 prize money
* per team

ATP singles main-draw entrants

Seeds 

 1 Rankings are as of July 1, 2019

Other entrants 
The following players received wildcards into the singles main draw:
  Alejandro Davidovich Fokina 
  Elias Ymer
  Mikael Ymer

The following players received entry using a protected ranking into the main draw:
  Steve Darcis
  Jozef Kovalík

The following players received entry from the qualifying draw:
  Facundo Argüello
  Pablo Carreño Busta
  Constant Lestienne
  Bernabé Zapata Miralles

Withdrawals 
Before the tournament
  Matteo Berrettini → replaced by  Thiago Monteiro
  Lorenzo Sonego → replaced by  Dennis Novak

Retirements 
  Ernests Gulbis

ATP doubles main-draw entrants

Seeds 

 Rankings are as of July 1, 2019

Other entrants 
The following pairs received wildcards into the doubles main draw:
  Markus Eriksson /  André Göransson
  Elias Ymer /  Mikael Ymer

WTA singles main-draw entrants

Seeds 

 1 Rankings are as of July 1, 2019

Other entrants 
The following players received wildcards into the singles main draw:
  Mirjam Björklund
  Susanne Celik
  Caijsa Hennemann
  Cornelia Lister

Withdrawals 
  Paula Badosa → replaced by  Kimberley Zimmermann
  Ana Bogdan → replaced by  Katarzyna Kawa
  Marie Bouzková → replaced by  Johanna Larsson
  Beatriz Haddad Maia → replaced by  Ekaterine Gorgodze
  Polona Hercog → replaced by  Tereza Mrdeža
  Ivana Jorović → replaced by  Danka Kovinić
  Kaja Juvan → replaced by  Jana Čepelová
  Barbora Krejčíková → replaced by  Dalma Gálfi
  Kristýna Plíšková → replaced by  Andrea Gámiz
  Anastasia Potapova → replaced by  Başak Eraydın
  Anna Karolína Schmiedlová → replaced by  Anhelina Kalinina
  Laura Siegemund → replaced by  Anna Zaja
  Zhang Shuai → replaced by  Paula Ormaechea
  Tamara Zidanšek → replaced by  Sara Errani

WTA doubles main-draw entrants

Seeds 

 1 Rankings are as of July 1, 2019

Other entrants 
The following pair received a wildcard into the doubles main draw:
  Caijsa Hennemann /  Fanny Östlund

Champions

Men's singles 

  Nicolás Jarry def.  Juan Ignacio Londero, 7–6(9–7), 6–4

Women's singles 

  Misaki Doi def.  Danka Kovinić, 6–4, 6–4

Men's doubles 

  Sander Gillé /  Joran Vliegen def.  Federico Delbonis /  Horacio Zeballos, 6–7(5–7), 7–5, [10–5]

Women's doubles 

  Misaki Doi /  Natalia Vikhlyantseva def.  Alexa Guarachi /  Danka Kovinić, 7–5, 6–7(4–7), [10–7]

References

External links 

 

Swedish Open
Swedish Open
Swedish Open
Swedish Open
2019 in Swedish tennis